Hydriastele hombronii (formerly Gulubia hombronii) is a species of flowering plant in the family Arecaceae.

It is found only in Solomon Islands and is threatened by habitat loss.

References

Areceae
Flora of the Solomon Islands (archipelago)
Data deficient plants
Taxa named by Odoardo Beccari
Taxonomy articles created by Polbot
Taxobox binomials not recognized by IUCN